The 1884 United States presidential election in Kentucky took place on November 4, 1884. All contemporary thirty-eight states were part of the 1884 United States presidential election. Kentucky voters chose thirteen electors to the Electoral College, which selected the president and vice president.

Background and vote
Ever since the Civil War, Kentucky had been shaped politically by divisions created by that war between secessionist, Democratic counties and Unionist, Republican ones, although the state as a whole leaned Democratic throughout this era and the GOP would never carry the state during the Third Party System at either presidential or gubernatorial level. What would become a long-lived partisan system after the state was freed from the direct control of former Confederates would not be seriously affected by the first post-war insurgency movement – that of the Greenback Party at the tail end of the 1870s in the secessionist Jackson Purchase and other western regions. The Democratic Party would permanently lose some of the Greenback voters, especially in the Western Coal Field region, with the result that nominee Grover Cleveland lost three points on Winfield Scott Hancock’s 1880 margin.

, this is the last occasion when Russell County voted for a Democratic presidential candidate.

Results

Results by county

References 

Kentucky
1884
1884 Kentucky elections